The Savage Rivale Roadyacht GTS is a sports car built in 2009.

Development
The car was presented for the first time at the Top Marques in Montecarlo, was created by two Dutch students, Emile Pop and Justin de Boer. Production was limited to 20 units.

Specifications 
The retractable roof, activated by an electric control, was made of glass panels reinforced with carbon fiber and had a multi-panel telescopic configuration that allowed it to close thanks to the overlapping of the panels in the boot.

Savage Rivale GTR  
The Racing version of this car named Savage Rivale Roadyacht GTR which unveiled in 2011.

Media
The Roadyacht GTS & Rivale GTR is featured in video games: Driveclub, Asphalt 8: Airborne & GT Racing 2: The Real Car Experience.

Other models

Coastrunner EV
The Coastrunner EV is an electric buggy designed by Savage Rivale, the Dutch brand behind the 2009 Roadyacht GTS sports car and Mirage 18GT yacht.

References

External links
 Savage Rivale website

Cars introduced in 2009
Front mid-engine, rear-wheel-drive vehicles
Cars of the Netherlands
2010s cars
Hardtop convertibles
Convertibles
Sports sedans